Hunting ISIS is a documentary television series about Americans fighting the Islamic State of Iraq and the Levant, broadcast by Viceland in 2018.

See also
 List of programs broadcast by Viceland

References

2018 American television series debuts
Islamic State of Iraq and the Levant
Viceland original programming